The 1951–52 Kansas Jayhawks men's basketball team represented the University of Kansas in the 1951–52 NCAA men's basketball season, which was the Jayhawks' 54th. They were led by legendary coach Phog Allen in his 35th season overall, 33rd consecutive. He guided Kansas to its first NCAA Tournament championship, their 3rd National Championship overall, behind center Clyde Lovellette, who scored 33 points and grabbed 17 rebounds in an 80-63 victory over St. John's in the title game. Lovellette became the only player in NCAA history to lead the nation in scoring while leading his team to the national championship in the same season. Also on the team was Dean Smith, who later went on to a Hall of Fame coaching career at North Carolina. Seven members of the team, as well as Allen, would be named to the 1952 United States men's Olympic basketball team.

Roster

Schedule

Rankings

Awards and honors
 Clyde Lovellette, NCAA Men's MOP Award

Team players drafted into the NBA

References

Kansas
Kansas
Kansas Jayhawks men's basketball seasons
NCAA Division I men's basketball tournament championship seasons
NCAA Division I men's basketball tournament Final Four seasons
Kansas
Kansas
Kansas